Seven Sisters Onllwyn  F.C. is a Welsh football team based in Neath, currently playing in the Ardal SW, which is at the third tier of the Welsh football pyramid.

History
The club played in the Welsh Football League until 1997. After a season out of the league they rejoined for the 1998–99 season in Division Three where they remained until the end of the 2009–10 season when they left the league. The club then joined the Neath & District League.

For the 2020–21 season the club joined the newly formed Tier 4 West Wales Premier League.  The club merged with Onllwyn to become Seven Sisters Onllwyn AFC in a move announced by the club on 13 July 2020, with the first team to compete in the West Wales Premier League along with two teams in the Neath & District League.

On 9 June 2022, the it was announced that the club had been promoted to the tier 3 Ardal SW League for the 2022–23 season via the vacancy route.

Honours

West Wales Intermediate Cup – Winners: 2021–22
Welsh Football League Division Three - Runners-up: 2003–04
Neath & District League Premier Division - Champions (3): 1930–31; 1997–98; 2019–20

Committee members

 Secretary : Jeff Bloffwitch
 Fixture Secretary: David Herdman
 Treasurer : Andrew Loynes 
 Groundsman: Richard Herdman / Lee Davies
 Committee members:

References

External links
Official website

Football clubs in Wales
Association football clubs established in 1910
1910 establishments in Wales
Sport in Neath Port Talbot
Welsh Football League clubs
Neath & District League clubs
West Wales Premier League clubs
Ardal Leagues clubs